Nefilim was a industrial death metal studio project formed by Carl McCoy with John "Capachino" Carter in 1992 after the disbanding of Fields of the Nephilim. It featured McCoy on vocals and keyboards and John Carter on bass, guitars and drums. The album title track Zoon was written during this period, as were now famed demos including "Red Harvest777", "Chaochracy" and "Subsanity (Sensorium)". After a year Carter and McCoy parted company, and McCoy went on to recruit Paul Miles on guitar, Simon Rippin on drums and Cian Houchin on bass. The lineup released one album, Zoon (1996), which was more influenced by death metal and industrial metal than McCoy's previous releases with the Fields of the Nephilim, though similar themes of mysticism are prevalent, seen in songs like "Pazuzu (Black Rain)," which refers to the Assyro-Babylonian god also known as "king of the demons." Rippin and Miles would later go on to form Sensorium, while Houchin would go on to form Saints of Eden. McCoy and Carter would later re-establish Fields of the Nephilim as a living entity which still performs today.

Discography

Zoon

Zoon, Nefilim's only studio album, was released in April 1996 by Beggars Banquet Records (Catalogue number BEGA172). The album saw a move away from the rich soundscapes that characterised earlier works from Fields of the Nephilim towards a darker, more industrial/death metal sound. McCoy has stated that the album was in development hell for several years, due to restrictions from the record label. The album is dedicated to Scarlett McCoy, Carl McCoy's daughter.

A music video was created for "Penetration", and the song was later covered by Polish band Behemoth on their EP Slaves Shall Serve.

The album is a concept album, and while McCoy remained largely silent about the themes, one possible explanation is that the story revolves around the Watchers and the Book of Enoch. The word "zoon" is derived from Greek, meaning "living creature" or "beast".

Track listing
"Still Life"
"Xodus"
"Shine"
"Penetration"
"Melt (The Catching of the Butterfly)"
"Venus Decomposing"
"Pazuzu (Black Rain)"
"Zoon, Parts 1 & 2: Saturation"
"Zoon, Part 3: Wake World"
"Coma"

Singles
Xodus (1995)
Penetration (1996)

References

External links

 Official website of Fields of the Nephilim and Nefilim
 
 
 Paul Miles now runs a recording studio in North London

British industrial music groups
British industrial metal musical groups
British gothic metal musical groups